Leucopogon decrescens is a species of flowering plant in the heath family Ericaceae and is endemic to the far south-west of Western Australia. It is an erect shrub with hairy young branchlets, spirally arranged, narrowly egg-shaped leaves, and white, bell-shaped flowers often with a pink tinge.

Description

Taxonomy and naming
Leucopogon decrescens was first formally described in 2014 by Michael Clyde Hislop in the journal Nuytsia from specimens he collected near Rocky Gully in 2008. The specific epithet (decrescens) means "diminishing" or "narrowing", referring to the outline of the leaves from their widest point to the tip.

Distribution and habitat
This leucopogon grows in woodland or heath and occurs in a narrow band from the Whicher Range to Rocky Gully and Mount Barker in the Jarrah Forest and Warren bioregions in the far south-west of Western Australia.

Conservation status
Leucopogon decrescens is classified as "not threatened" by the Western Australian Government Department of Biodiversity, Conservation and Attractions

References

decrescens
Ericales of Australia
Flora of Western Australia
Plants described in 2014